Kansas's 37th Senate district is one of 40 districts in the Kansas Senate. It has been represented by Republican Molly Baumgardner since a 2014 special election to replace fellow Republican Pat Apple.

Geography
District 37 covers in southern Johnson County and northern Miami County in the outskirts of the Kansas City suburbs, including Paola, Spring Hill, Louisburg, Edgerton, and the southern reaches of Gardner, Olathe, and Overland Park.

The district overlaps with Kansas's 2nd and 3rd congressional districts, and with the 5th, 6th, 8th, 26th, 27th, 43rd, 48th, and 78th districts of the Kansas House of Representatives. It borders the state of Missouri.

Recent election results

2020

2016

2014 special

2012

Federal and statewide results in District 37

References

37
Johnson County, Kansas
Miami County, Kansas